Lauvøya is an island in the municipality of Åfjord in Trøndelag county, Norway.

The island is located south of the islands of Linesøya and Stokkøya. There are about 25 inhabitants on the  island.

See also
List of islands of Norway

References

Islands of Trøndelag
Åfjord